Muslim Southeast Asia refers to those areas of Southeast Asia that have significant populations of Muslims. It includes:
 Most parts of Indonesia including most of Java, Sumatra, Kalimantan, West Nusa Tenggara, North Maluku and Sulawesi (Java and Sumatra alone have the majority of Indonesia's population).
 But not including North Sulawesi, West Papua, Papua, East Nusa Tenggara and Maluku province which are mainly Christian, and Bali which is mainly Hindu.
 Peninsular Malaysia and Sabah
 Brunei
 Southern Philippines (Bangsamoro)
 Southern Thailand
 Westernmost parts of Myanmar, near the Bangladeshi border. 

Culturally, it would also include the Malay people of Singapore and Sarawak, Cham people of Cambodia and Vietnam, and other Muslim communities in Southeast Asia.

See also 
 Islam in Southeast Asia

References
 Islam in an Era of Nation-States: Politics and Religious Renewal in Muslim Southeast Asia, edited by Robert W. Hefner; Patricia Horvatich, University of Hawaii Press, Dec 2007 
 Barendregt, Bart. 2006. “Nasyid in the Making: Transnational Soundscapes for Muslim Southeast Asia.” in Medi@Asia: Communication, Culture, Context, Holden, T. and T. Scrase (eds.), pp. 171–187, London: Routledge.

External links

Geography of Southeast Asia
Sunni Islam in Asia
Maritime Southeast Asia